Lips: Party Classics is a karaoke video game for the Xbox 360, and the second follow-up to the original Lips. The game was developed by iNiS and published by Microsoft Game Studios. The game, like all the other titles in the main Lips series, features the use of motion sensitive wireless microphones and includes 40 upbeat songs from the past decades.

Gameplay changes

For the first time in the series, Party Classics is compatible with regular USB microphones. Also, while Lips: Number One Hits already supports a recording feature, Party Classics features an enhanced version of it. The game features new achievements and Avatar Awards.

Track list

Reception

Lips: Party Classics received "average" reviews according to the review aggregation website Metacritic. The game was praised for having a very strong playlist, but was criticized for a lack of novelties.

See also
SingStar
UltraStar - An open-source clone of the SingStar engine
Rock Band
Guitar Hero World Tour
Karaoke Revolution
Karaoke Revolution (2009)
Lips: Number One Hits
Guitar Hero 5
The Beatles: Rock Band
Lips

References

External links
 Official website
 

2010 video games
Microsoft games
Karaoke video games
Music video games
Video games developed in Japan
Xbox 360-only games
Xbox 360 games
Lips (video game)
Multiplayer and single-player video games